Henry Dinwoodey Moyle (April 22, 1889 – September 18, 1963) was a member of the Quorum of the Twelve Apostles  and the First Presidency of the Church of Jesus Christ of Latter-day Saints (LDS Church).

Early life
Moyle was born in Salt Lake City, Utah Territory, to politician James Moyle and his wife Alice Dinwoodey. He studied at the University of Utah and served as an LDS Church missionary in Switzerland and in Germany. During World War I, Moyle served in the US military.

Moyle continued his studies at the University of Chicago and Harvard Law School. He was also a student at the School of Mines in Freiberg, Saxony. In 1920, Moyle was appointed to the position of United States attorney for the state of Utah.

Employment
Moyle was for many years a lawyer and a part-time member of the University of Utah faculty. He was also a businessman involved in various railroad, trucking, oil, insurance and finance businesses. During World War II, he was the director of the Petroleum Industries Council.

LDS Church Service
From 1927 to 1937, Moyle was the president of the LDS Church's Cottonwood Stake, located in the south-east suburbs of Salt Lake City. He also served as chairman of the church's Welfare Committee.

Apostle and member of the First Presidency
Moyle was ordained an apostle and member of the Quorum of the Twelve Apostles on April 10, 1947. Moyle served as Second Counselor in the First Presidency to church president David O. McKay from June 12, 1959, to October 12, 1961, when he was called as First Counselor. He was First Counselor in the First Presidency until his death.

Moyle was a successful cattleman and originated the idea of the church establishing a cattle ranch in Florida. He was convinced that Florida's climate would prove ideal for raising cattle, as the key to success in that industry is growing grass. Deseret Cattle and Citrus Ranch, which is east of Orlando, is today the world's largest beef ranch, and the land is worth an estimated $858 million.

Moyle spearheaded much of the church's building program in the early 1960s. He believed that the Church Office Building, the headquarters of the LDS Church, should have been twice its size. He was also convinced that by building larger meetinghouses, the church would attract more converts. Moyle convinced McKay not to publish an account of church spending as was customary in order to hide the extent of the budget deficit caused by spending on buildings. By 1962, the deficit had reach $32 million. His optimistic building programs placed a considerable financial strain upon the church and McKay eventually relieved Moyle from many of his administrative responsibilities.

The controversial "baseball baptism" program was Moyle's idea to increase baptisms in order to fill the church meetinghouses. Missionaries would encourage young men to join sports leagues and used baptism as a prerequisite. Under this approach, large numbers of young men were baptized but very few were ever active in the church. The rush to baptize was accompanied with the establishment of baptism quotas for missionaries and memorized missionary discussions which were to be delivered verbatim to potential converts. The rest of the apostles were largely opposed to these changes, which led to Moyle being relieved of his responsibilities in the missionary department.

Moyle died of heart disease in Deer Park, Florida, aged 74, and was buried at Salt Lake City Cemetery.

Family
In 1920, Moyle married Clara Alberta Wright in the Salt Lake Temple; they were the parents of six children. One of his sons, Henry D. Moyle, Jr., was the first president of the French East Mission (based in Geneva, Switzerland) starting in 1961.

See also
Alvin R. Dyer

References

Sources
Arnold K. Garr, et al., Encyclopedia of Latter-day Saint History, p. 801.

External links

 Working the Divine Miracle, by Richard D. Poll

1889 births
1963 deaths
20th-century American lawyers
20th-century Mormon missionaries
American Mormon missionaries in Germany
American Mormon missionaries in Switzerland
American general authorities (LDS Church)
American military personnel of World War I
Apostles (LDS Church)
Burials at Salt Lake City Cemetery
Counselors in the First Presidency (LDS Church)
Harvard Law School alumni
Latter Day Saints from Utah
Lawyers from Salt Lake City
Military personnel from Utah
People from Salt Lake City
United States Attorneys for the District of Utah
University of Chicago alumni
University of Utah alumni
University of Utah faculty
Utah Democrats